José Luis Roldán Carmona (born November 13, 1985 in La Zubia) is a Spanish former professional road racing cyclist. He rode in the 2011 Vuelta a España.

Palmares
2008
7th Vuelta Ciclista a León

References

1985 births
Living people
Spanish male cyclists
Sportspeople from the Province of Granada
Cyclists from Andalusia